The 1990 UK & Ireland Greyhound Racing Year was the 64th year of greyhound racing in the United Kingdom and Ireland.

Roll of honour

Summary
The greyhound betting levy bill was heard for a second time before parliament. The first had been read in 1989. Extracts from the reading were described by Alan Meale (MP for Mansfield) - "The purpose of the Bill is straightforward; it is to amend the Betting, Gaming and Lotteries Act 1963 to enable payment of a levy to the greyhound industry from moneys already deducted from punters for that purpose by the bookmakers in off-course betting establishments. There is a great need for this legislation. Greyhound racing is the second most supported spectator sport in Britain. As census figures show, more than 5 million people support the sport by going along to tracks every week. They attend 83 tracks, 48 of which are independent and 35 of which are registered with the National Greyhound Racing Club. The membership of that club and of the independents now amounts to more than 15,000 greyhound owners. More than 20,000 greyhounds are registered and in training. At least 10,000 race meetings are held every year, accommodating over 120,000 greyhound races. Unlike the horse racing industry, the greyhound industry receives no levy money whatever; although moneys are deducted at source in betting shops off-course, throughout Britain. That is a scandal of huge proportions because 10 per cent.—10p in every pound—is deducted from bets, under the legislation to which I have referred, with the purpose of 2% of that 10% coming back into the sport. Most punters are having that money deducted fraudulently because at present the only money that goes back into the greyhound industry returns via the Legislation is in place to ensure that a similar deduction benefits horse racing. Twenty-seven percent of all off-course betting is on greyhound racing, yet not one penny of that money goes back into the industry. Instead, it all goes into the pockets of bookmakers, who do nothing for that magnificent sport". It being half-past Two o'clock, the debate stood adjourned.
 
In addition to this, new laws now required all sporting stadia to make safety improvements following the problems related to football. The industry felt that it was being persecuted by the government.

In Ireland the racing industry received €3.5 million in the budget but the Bord na gCon was unhappy that they would only receive €500,000.

The National Greyhound Racing Club (NGRC) released the annual returns, with totalisator turnover at £104,779,742 and attendances recorded at 4,220,906 from 5803 meetings. Track tote deduction remained at 17.5%.

Westmead Harry trained by Natalie Savva was voted Greyhound of the Year after winning the Scottish Greyhound Derby at Shawfield Stadium in a track record time, the Select Stakes, Blue Riband and Eclipse. Adraville Bridge was voted Irish Greyhound of the Year after winning the Laurels, National Produce and Dundalk International. John McGee won the Greyhound Trainer of the Year for the third successive year.

Tracks
Playbell Ltd (owners of Poole) removed the greyhound track to accommodate a larger football pitch but a new Perry Barr Stadium opened, promoted by Maurice Buckland at the former athletics stadium, this was six years after the closure of the old stadium at Walsall Road.

At the end of 1988 businessmen and race horse owner Terry Robson and Harry Williams had got together and decided to take on the Sunderland stadium. Williams a respected former trainer at Brough Park helped design the new track and over £1 million was spent rebuilding the facilities. There was a new restaurant, private boxes and an application to the NGRC.

News
Champion trainer John McGee joined Hackney in place of Doreen Boyce. Chris Page took over as Walthamstow Racing Manager from departing Tony Smith.

Competitions
A brindle greyhound called Ravage Again dominated the sprint events, the greyhound trained by Willie Frew in Scotland by Tico out of Drominidy Rose had been bought for £5,500 by Frew, for owners David Fleming and Ian Rutherford. He won heat and final of a Clonmel sprint during the festival week and then after returning to Scotland, he continued to add to his winning sequence on the northern circuit. At 16 successive wins (in June) Ladbrokes offered 300-1 that he would better Ballyregan Bob's world record of 32 successive wins. Controversy over the wager surfaced when it was revealed that Ravage Again's two wins in Ireland would not been counted.

Willie Frew sent to the greyhound to be trained in the south by Terry Dartnall, partly because he wanted to prove that he could beat the southern opposition as well. after 22 wins Ravage Again went unbeaten through the Etherington Golden Sprint at Hove, breaking the 285 metre track record in the heats and final. A close call at Hall Green ended with a short head victory before another win at Swindon. He returned north to Frew and won race 28 at Shawfield on 22 December, ending the year on course for a new world record.

Dempseys Whisper scored a classic double, the fawn dog won both the Gold Collar at Catford Stadium and Grand Prix at Walthamstow Stadium. He completed a great year getting to the St Leger and Oaks final as well and was unlucky not to win the title of greyhound of the year.

Principal UK races

+Track Record

Totalisator returns

The totalisator returns declared to the National Greyhound Racing Club for the year 1990 are listed below.

References 

Greyhound racing in the United Kingdom
Greyhound racing in the Republic of Ireland
UK and Ireland Greyhound Racing Year
UK and Ireland Greyhound Racing Year
UK and Ireland Greyhound Racing Year
UK and Ireland Greyhound Racing Year